Arthur George Marshall  (born October 1881) was an English footballer. His regular position was at full back. He was born in Liverpool. He played for Manchester United, Everton, Chester City, Crewe Alexandra, Stockport County, Portsmouth, and Leicester Fosse.

External links
MUFCInfo.com profile

1881 births
English footballers
Manchester United F.C. players
Leicester City F.C. players
Everton F.C. players
Chester City F.C. players
Crewe Alexandra F.C. players
Stockport County F.C. players
Portsmouth F.C. players
Year of death missing
Association football fullbacks